Shorty Lungkata Tjungurrayyi, c. 1920 - 1987 is a Pintupi man born at Walukuritji, south of Lake Macdonald, and is best known as an artist, and important member with Papunya Tula Artists.

Following the move to Papunya Tjungurayyi became a ngangkari and traditional doctor.

Tjungurayyi first made contact with Papunya Tula Artists in February 1972 and, as a part of this movement, he experimented with a variety of styles from simple figurative imagery to significantly more complex work; these artworks referenced Western Desert iconography used in body painting for ceremony and ritual ground paintings.

Tjungurayyi is an often under recognised artist in the Western Desert art movement.

References 

1920s births
1987 deaths
Pintupi
Australian Aboriginal artists